Hemendra Singh Banera (18 January 1946 – 31 May 2021) was an Indian politician. At age 25, Singh Banera was elected as one of the youngest members in the history of the Lok Sabha, the lower house of the Parliament of India, representing Bhilwara, Rajasthan as a member of the Janata Dal.

References

External links
 Official biographical sketch in Parliament of India website

1946 births
2021 deaths
Deaths from the COVID-19 pandemic in India
India MPs 1957–1962
India MPs 1967–1970
Lok Sabha members from Rajasthan
Janata Dal politicians
Bharatiya Jana Sangh politicians
People from Udaipur